An Inlet of Muddy Water is a 1953 Japanese drama film based on short stories by Ichiyō Higuchi and directed by Tadashi Imai. It was entered into the 1954 Cannes Film Festival and awarded numerous national film prizes.

Plot
In three episodes, the film portrays the fate of women during the Meiji era:

1. The Thirteenth Night: Young wife Seki turns up at her parents' house, announcing that she wants to divorce her abusive husband. Her father talks her into returning to her marital home, as her parents' welfare and the career of her brother depend on the marriage, also reminding her that she will have to leave her young son behind. On her way back home in a rickshaw, she discovers that the driver is Rokunosuke, a childhood friend who never got over their separation. They reminisce their once mutual affection, but part ways without an outlook to meeting again.

2. On The Last Day Of The Year: Mine works as a maid in the strict household of Mrs. Yamamura, wife of a wealthy businessman. To help her sick uncle who is in debt, Mine asks her employer to lend her money. Mrs. Yamamura first agrees, but later withdraws her offer. Out of desperation, Mine steals money from a household drawer and gives it to her aunt. Moments before her misdemeanour is revealed, Mrs. Yamamura's carefree son Ishinosuke takes the remaining money to waste it on gambling and drinking, thus obliterating all traces of Mine's theft.

3. Troubled Waters: Courtesan O-Riki is the "star" of a brothel in a red light district. To her disapproval, she is still being followed by her impoverished former patron Genshichi who spent all his money on her. O-Riki gets involved with a new client, Asanosuke, but is reluctant to the possible prospect of marriage, citing her profession and her poor upbringing as reasons. Meanwhile, Genshichi forces his wife and little son to leave him due to her constant complaints that he is unable to support the family. Afterwards, he waylays O-Riki, murders her and commits suicide.

Cast
Episode 1 "The Thirteenth Night"
 Ken Mitsuda as Saito Kanae
 Akiko Tamura as Saito Moyo
 Hiro Kumon as Saito Inosuke
 Yatsuko Tanami as Harada Seki
 Hiroshi Akutagawa as Takasaka Rokunosuke

Episode 2 "On The Last Day Of The Year"
 Susumu Tatsuoka as Yamamura Kahee
 Teruko Nagaoka as Yamamura Aya
 Noboru Nakaya as Yamamura Ishinosuke
 Kyōko Kishida as Yamamura Shizuko
 Yoshiko Kuga as Mine
 Nobuo Nakamura as Yasubee
 Michiko Araki as Shin
 Shiro Inui as Minosuke
 Kazuo Kitamura as Rickshaw man

Episode 3 "Troubled Waters"
 Hisao Toake as Tobei
 Yoshie Minami as O-Yae
 Chikage Awashima as O-Riki
 So Yamamura as Asanosuke
 Seiji Miyaguchi as Genshichi
 Haruko Sugimura as O-Hatsu
 Maiko Hojo as O-Taka

Literary source
An Inlet of Muddy Water is based on Ichiyō Higuchi's short stories The Thirteenth Night (1895), On the Last Day of the Year (1894), and Troubled Waters (also: Muddy Bay, 1895). Other than the film, Higuchi's original story Troubled Waters ends with the discovery of the bodies of O-Riki and Genshichi and the passersby's speculations whether the two committed shinjū (lovers' double suicide) or O-Riki fell victim to a crime, leaving it to the reader to decide.

Awards and filmhistoric relevance
An Inlet of Muddy Water was awarded the Kinema Junpo Award, the Blue Ribbon Award and the Mainichi Film Award for Best Film and is regarded by film historians as one of director Tadashi Imai's major works. Two additional Mainichi Film Awards went to Imai for Best Direction and Haruko Sugimura as Best Supporting Actress (for An Inlet of Muddy Water and Tokyo Story).

References

External links

1953 films
1953 drama films
Japanese drama films
1950s Japanese-language films
Japanese black-and-white films
Films based on short fiction
Films directed by Imai Tadashi
Films set in the Meiji period
Best Film Kinema Junpo Award winners
1950s Japanese films